Juan José Torres (born 26 November 1957) is a Spanish middle-distance runner. He competed in the men's 3000 metres steeplechase at the 1984 Summer Olympics.

References

1957 births
Living people
Athletes (track and field) at the 1984 Summer Olympics
Spanish male middle-distance runners
Spanish male steeplechase runners
Olympic athletes of Spain
Place of birth missing (living people)
20th-century Spanish people